Jenson Brooksby was the defending champion but withdrew from the quarterfinals.

Christopher Eubanks won the title after defeating Nicolás Mejía 2–6, 7–6(7–3), 6–4 in the final.

Seeds

Draw

Finals

Top half

Bottom half

References

External links
Main draw
Qualifying draw

Orlando Open II - 1